The voiced alveolar lateral fricative is a type of consonantal sound, used in some spoken languages.

Features
Features of the voiced alveolar lateral fricative:

Occurrence

Dental or denti-alveolar

Alveolar
{| class="wikitable"
! colspan="2" | Language
! Word
! IPA
! Meaning
! Notes
|-
| colspan="2" | Adyghe
| 
|  
| 'town'
| Can also be pronounced as 
|-
| colspan="2" | Bura
| 
|
|
|-
| colspan="2" | Kabardian
|
| 
| 'seven'
| Can also be pronounced as 
|-
| colspan="2" | Ket
|  
|
|
|
|-
| colspan="2" | Moloko
| 
|
| 'start, begin'
|-
| colspan="2" | Mongolian
| 
|
| 'Mongol'
| Sometimes realized as 
|-
| colspan="2" | Sassarese
| caldhu
| 
| 'hot'
|
|-
| colspan="2" | Tera
| {{lang|ttr|dlepti'}}
| 
| 'planting'
| Contrasts with both  and 
|-
| colspan="2" | Zulu
| 
|
| 'to eat'
|}

Related characters
There are several Unicode characters based on lezh (ɮ):
 is a superscript IPA letter
 is a superscript IPA letter
 is an extension to IPA for disordered speech (extIPA)

Notation

In 1938, a symbol shaped similarly to heng  was approved as the official IPA symbol for the voiced alveolar lateral fricative, replacing . It was suggested at the same time, however, that a compromise shaped like something between the two may also be used at the author's discretion. Despite the Association's prescription,  is nonetheless seen in literature from the 1960s to the 1980s.

See also
Index of phonetics articles
Voiceless alveolar lateral fricative

Notes

References

External links
 

Alveolar consonants
Fricative consonants
Lateral consonants
Pulmonic consonants
Voiced oral consonants